Adoor State assembly constituency is one of the 140 state legislative assembly constituencies representing Adoor in the Pathanamthitta district of the state Kerala in India. It is also one of the 7 state legislative assembly constituencies included in the Pathanamthitta Lok Sabha constituency. The current MLA is Chittayam Gopakumar of CPI.

Local self governed segments
Adoor Niyamasabha constituency is composed of the following local self governed segments:

Members of Legislative Assembly 
The following list contains all members of Kerala legislative assembly who have represented the constituency:

Key

Election results 
Percentage change (±%) denotes the change in the number of votes from the immediate previous election.

Niyamasabha Election 2021 
There were 2,08,099 registered voters in the constituency for the 2021 Kerala Niyamasabha Election.

Niyamasabha Election 2016 
There were 2,08,432 registered voters in the constituency for the 2016 Kerala Niyamasabha Election.

Niyamasabha Election 2011 
There were 1,94,014 registered voters in the constituency for the 2011 election.

References 

Assembly constituencies of Kerala

State assembly constituencies in Pathanamthitta district